An ogive is the roundly tapered end of a two-dimensional or three-dimensional object. Ogive curves and surfaces are used in engineering, architecture and woodworking.

Etymology
The earliest use of the word ogive is found in the 13th century sketchbook of Villard de Honnecourt, from Picardy in northern France. However, Merriam-Webster's dictionary says it is from the "Middle English  stone comprising an arch, from Middle French  diagonal arch".

Types and use in applied physical science and engineering

In ballistics or aerodynamics, an ogive is a pointed, curved surface mainly used to form the approximately streamlined nose of a bullet or other projectile, reducing air resistance or the drag of air. In fact the French word ogive can be translated as "nose cone" or "warhead". 

The traditional or secant ogive is a surface of revolution of the same curve that forms a Gothic arch; that is, a circular arc, of greater radius than the diameter of the cylindrical section ("shank"), is drawn from the edge of the shank until it intercepts the axis.

If this arc is drawn so that it meets the shank at zero angle (that is, the distance of the centre of the arc from the axis, plus the radius of the shank, equals the radius of the arc), then it is called a tangent or spitzer ogive. This is a very common ogive for high velocity (supersonic) rifle bullets.

The sharpness of this ogive is expressed by the ratio of its radius to the diameter of the cylinder; a value of one half being a hemispherical dome, and larger values being progressively more pointed. Values of 4 to 10 are commonly used in rifle bullets, with 6 being the most common.

Another common ogive for bullets is the elliptical ogive. This is a curve very similar to the spitzer ogive, except that the circular arc is replaced by an ellipse defined in such a way that it meets the axis at exactly 90°. This gives a somewhat rounded nose regardless of the sharpness ratio. An elliptical ogive is normally described in terms of the ratio of the length of the ogive to the diameter of the shank. A ratio of one half would be, once again, a hemisphere. Values close to 1 are common in practice. Elliptical ogives are mainly used in pistol bullets.

More complex ogives can be derived from minimum turbulence calculations rather than geometric forms, such as the von Kármán ogive used for supersonic missiles, aircraft and ordnance.

Architecture

One of the defining characteristics of Gothic architecture is the pointed arch. This may have originated as in Sitamarhi caves in 3rd century BCE. The free-standing temple of Trivikrama at Ter in Maharashtra India dated to Satavahana period also contains ogive arch but it is constructed using principles of corbel.

Archaeological excavation conducted by Archaeological Survey of India (ASI) at Kausambi revealed a palace with its foundations going back to 8th century BCE until 2nd century CE and built in six phases. The last phase dated to 1st–2nd century CE, featured an extensive structure which features four centered pointed arches which were used to span narrow passageways and segmental arches for wider areas. Pointed arches as load bearing function were also employed in Gandhara. Two pointed arch vault system was built inside the Bhitargaon temple as noted by Alexander Cunningham, which is dated to early Gupta period of the 4th–5th centuries CE. Pointed arches also appeared in Mahabodhi temple with relieving arches and vaults between the 6th and 7th centuries CE.

The pointed arch as an architectonic principle in the Middle East, is said by several scholars to have first been established in Islamic architecture during the Abbasid Caliphate in the middle of the 8th century CE, and in Gothic architecture in the 11th century CE. Some scholars have refused to accept Indian origin of pointed arch including Hill (1993), some scholars have argued that pointed arches were used in the Near East in pre-Islamic architecture, but others have stated that these arches were, in fact, parabolic and not pointed arches.

In Gothic architecture, ogives are the intersecting transverse ribs of arches which establish the surface of a Gothic vault. An ogive or ogival arch is a pointed, "Gothic" arch, drawn with compasses as outlined above, or with arcs of an ellipse as described. A very narrow, steeply pointed ogive arch is sometimes called a "lancet arch". The most common form is an equilateral arch, where the radius is the same as the width. In the later Flamboyant Gothic style, an "ogee arch", an arch with a pointed head, like S-shaped curves, became prevalent.

Glaciology
In glaciology, the term ogives refers to alternating bands of light and dark coloured ice that occur as a result of glaciers moving through an icefall.

See also

 Catenary arch
 Lancet window
 Nose cone design
 Ogee

References

Further reading
Verde, Tom, "The Point of the Arch", Aramco World, Volume 63, Number 3, 2012

Curves
Arches and vaults